Bruce Donald Klostermann (born April 17, 1963) is a former American football linebacker in the National Football League (NFL). He played college football at South Dakota State.

Early life and high school
Klostermann was born in Dubuque, Iowa and grew up in Dyersville, Iowa and attended Beckman Catholic High School, where he played fullback and linebacker on the football team and point guard on the basketball team. He was a co-captain of the football team along with future NFL first round pick Mike Haight.

College career
Klostermann began his collegiate career at Waldorf Junior College before transferring to the University of Iowa as a walk-on. He attended Iowa for one semester before transferring to South Dakota State. In his first season with the Jackrabbits, Klostermnan finished second on the team with 107 tackles. Klostermann was named second-team All-North Central Conference as a senior after he led the team in fumble recoveries and tackles for loss and finished second on the team in tackles and sacks.

Professional career
Klostermann was selected in the eighth round of the 1986 NFL Draft by the Denver Broncos. He injured his knee during training camp and spent the 1986 season on injured reserve. Klostermann played in 37 games with five starts over three seasons with the Broncos and played in Super Bowl XXII and Super Bowl XXIV. He was signed by the Oakland Raiders in 1990 but was cut on August 28. Klostermann was signed by the Los Angeles Rams on November 28, 1990 to play the rest of the season.

Personal life
Klostermann is married to Nancy and has three children: Erin, Zach, and Alyssa. Zach played football at Wartburg College, Erin played volleyball at St. Louis University while Alyssa played volleyball at the University of Iowa.

References

1963 births
Living people
American football linebackers
South Dakota State Jackrabbits football players
Los Angeles Rams players
Denver Broncos players
Players of American football from Iowa
Sportspeople from Dubuque, Iowa
People from Dyersville, Iowa